Lepyrodiclis is a genus of flowering plants belonging to the family Caryophyllaceae.

Its native range is Caucasus to Mongolia and Himalaya.

Species:

Lepyrodiclis holosteoides 
Lepyrodiclis stellarioides 
Lepyrodiclis tenera

References

Caryophyllaceae
Caryophyllaceae genera